The Gymnoascaceae are a family of fungi in the Ascomycota, class Eurotiomycetes.

References

Onygenales
Ascomycota families